My Little Pony: Pinkie Pie's Party is an adventure/puzzle video game developed by Webfoot Technologies and published by THQ under license from Hasbro, based on the My Little Pony franchise, specifically the 2003 toyline. The game was released for Nintendo DS on September 22, 2008.

Plot
The game takes place on Pinkie Pie's birthday, which is a very special day for her. But as a surprise, Sweetie Belle hid all of the gifts and puzzle pieces all over Ponyville and its up to her to find all of them, while celebrating her own birthday.

Gameplay
The player's objective in the game is to track down Pinkie Pie's presents and puzzle pieces hidden throughout Ponyville. As Pinkie Pie, the player navigates throughout the entire town looking for the puzzle pieces and gifts while interacting with other ponies. The top part of the Nintendo DS's screen acts as a map, with the puzzle pieces and gifts located in certain areas. The player can also save its progress throughout the game.

Similar to Crystal Princess: The Runaway Rainbow, the game also features puzzles and mini-games utilizing the Nintendo DS's capabilities.

Characters

Reception
IGN gave My Little Pony: Pinkie Pie's Party an overall score of 5.5 out of ten, noting it as a "basic" point and click adventure, and praised its "vibrant" artstyle that 'works well for the medium'. IGN criticized the game as having "lack of depth" and being too short.

References

External links

2008 video games
Adventure games
Puzzle video games
THQ games
North America-exclusive video games
Nintendo DS games
Nintendo DS-only games
Webfoot Technologies games
My Little Pony video games
Video games about birthdays
Video games developed in the United States